Johanna Liebeneiner is a German stage, film and television actress. She is the daughter of the actors Hilde Krahl and Wolfgang Liebeneiner.

References

Bibliography
 Goble, Alan. The Complete Index to Literary Sources in Film. Walter de Gruyter, 1999.

External links

1945 births
Living people
German film actresses
German television actresses
German stage actresses
20th-century German actresses
21st-century German actresses
Actresses from Hamburg